Roboastra arika is a species  of sea slug, a polycerid nudibranch, a marine gastropod mollusc in the family Polyceridae.

Distribution
This species was described from Lord Howe Island, Australia.

References

Polyceridae
Gastropods described in 1967